The second legislative assembly election for the Madras Presidency after the establishment of a bicameral legislature by the Government of India Act of 1935 was held in 1946.  The election was held after 6 years of Governor's rule starting from 1939, when the Indian National Congress government of C. Rajagopalachari resigned protesting Indian involvement in World War II.  This was the last election held in the presidency - after Indian independence in 1947, the presidency became the Madras state. The election was held simultaneously with that of the Legislative Council. The Congress swept the polls by winning 163 out of 215 seats. The years after this election saw factionalism in Madras Congress party with divisions across regional (mainly Tamil and Andhra) and communal (Brahman and non-Brahman) lines. Competition among T. Prakasam (Andhra Brahman), C. Rajagopalachari (Tamil Brahman) and K. Kamaraj (Tamil non-Brahman) resulted in the election of Prakasam as the Chief Minister initially. But he was later defeated by Omandur Ramaswamy Reddiar (Telugu non-Brahman) with Kamaraj's support. In turn, Reddiar himself was ousted to make way for P. S. Kumaraswamy Raja (Tamil non-Brahman) with the support of Kamaraj.

Background

Governor's rule in Madras
The Congress government which had come to power in Madras Presidency in 1937 after winning the 1937 elections resigned in October 1939, protesting India's involvement in the Second World War. The Presidency came under the direct rule of the Governor on 30 October 1939, according to Section 93 of the Government of India Act of 1935. It was extended two times on 15 February 1943 and on 29 September 1945 by the proclamation of the Governor. The Labour government headed by Clement Attlee came to power in the United Kingdom in July 1945. It was more sympathetic to the cause of Indian Independence Movement. Indian viceroy Lord Wavell, proposed a plan to break the constitutional deadlock. Called the "Wavell plan", it resulted in the release of all Congress political prisoners and called for the repeal of Section 93 and for fresh elections to be held. The Congress agreed to resume its participation in the electoral process and elections were scheduled for 1946.

Rajaji-Kamaraj rivalry in the Congress
The years before the 1946 election saw a bitter struggle between C. Rajagopalachari (Rajaji) and K. Kamaraj for the leadership of Madras provincial Congress. Rajaji had quit the Congress on 15 July 1942 over differences with Congress leaders on issues related to Pakistan. After his departure, the Tamil Nadu Congress leadership was firmly in the hands of Kamaraj, who enjoyed enormous popularity in the Tamil region of the Madras Presidency. Rajaji re-entered Congress again in mid-1945. His return was much appreciated by Congress high command as they felt the Presidency needed his service greatly. Sathyamurthy was dead, Prakasam's  popularity was confined to the Andhra region and Kamaraj was very young. Rajaji's claim to leadership found strong support in a Provincial Congress Committee meeting held in Tirupparankundram on 31 October 1945. To counter him, Kamaraj aligned himself with leaders like C. N. Muthuranga Mudaliar and M. Bhaktavatsalam. The Congress high command sent Asaf Ali to Madras in an effort to mediate between the pro- and anti-Rajaji factions. Kamaraj and Mudaliar wrote to the Congress high command protesting its interference in local politics and its preference of Rajaji. Sardar Vallabhbhai Patel felt it would be good for Rajaji to enter the Central Assembly. But Rajaji was interested in provincial politics and he wanted to contest from Madras University constituency. In summary, the Congress high command's contention that Madras Presidency Congress would be leaderless without Rajaji was not well received by Kamaraj and others and they were not willing to accept that it was acting purely in the interests of the province.

After visiting Madras to participate in the silver jubilee celebrations of the Dakshin Bharat Hindi Prachar Sabha (Institution for the propagation of Hindi in South India) during January 1946, Gandhi wrote an article in the Harijan supporting Rajaji's candidacy. The article titled "Curious" had a reference to a "clique" in Madras Congress against Rajaji. He concluded the article by saying,

The article led to a huge controversy in Madras province and Gandhi received several telegrams and letters condemning his article.  Some even threatened to fast if he did not withdraw the word "clique". However, Gandhi did not relent and withdraw his comments. On 12 February 1946, Kamaraj resigned from the Tamil Nadu Congress Parliamentary Board. Displeased with the controversy, Rajaji withdrew from active politics. Patel, who had worked hard to strengthen Rajaji's image, was enraged by his abrupt withdrawal and said,

However he accepted Rajaji's withdrawal from the Madras University constituency. This was the third time Rajaji had retired from political life, the other two occasions being in 1923 and 1936.
ḝ

Birth of Dravidar Kazhagam
The Justice party which had been the main political alternative to the Congress in the Presidency went into political wilderness following its defeat in the 1937 elections. During the Anti-Hindi agitations of 1937-40, it allied itself closely with Periyar E. V. Ramasamy and his Self-Respect Movement. Periyar eventually took over the Justice party's leadership on 29 December 1938. On 27 August 1944, it was renamed as Dravidar Kazhagam (DK). Under Periyar, the secessionist demand for Dravida Nadu became its main political plank. The DK boycotted the 1946 elections.

Participation of Communists
In 1942, the ban on the Communist Party of India (CPI), which had been in place since 1934, was lifted.  Under the leadership of P. C. Joshi, the communists decided to contest the 1946 elections. They contested 103 of the 215 seats and winning two (Railway Trade Union constituency and West Godhavari-Krishna-Guntur non-Union Factory Labour constituency).

Constituencies
The Government of India Act of 1935 had  created a bicameral legislature in the Madras province. The legislature consisted of the governor and two legislative bodies – a legislative assembly and a legislative council. The assembly consisted of 215 members who were further classified into general seats and those reserved for special communities and interests:

The Act provided for a limited adult franchise based on property qualifications. Separate ballot boxes were kept for candidates of different political parties. The Congress was allotted the yellow coloured box, while the Muslim League and the Communist Party of India were allotted green and red coloured boxes respectively.

Results
Party wise break up of seats after the 1946 election:

Government formation
The election was concluded on 30 March 1946. A new government had to be formed before the Governor's rule lapsed on 29 April. The Congress, despite securing an overwhelming majority, was unable to agree upon a candidate for Chief Minister. Madras Presidency in 1946 was made of four linguistic regions - Tamil Nadu, Andhra, Mysore and Kerala and the Madras Congress Legislature Party (CLP) had four main factions. The factions were both regional - Tamil versus Andhra and Tamil versus Keralites and Karnataka members; and communal - Brahmin versus non-Brahmin. The largest faction was that of the sixty to seventy non-Brahman Tamil members headed by Tamil Nadu Congress Committee president Kamaraj. The remaining Tamil members were either uncommitted or supported Rajaji, who also had the support of P. Subbarayan. They called themselves as the Reform Group and numbered between twenty and thirty. The Andhra faction made up of 77 members, was further divided between the supporters of Prakasam and Bhogaraju Pattabhi Sitaramayya. There were also smaller Andhra factions of non-Brahmins from the Circars and non-Brahmins from the Rayalaseema. CLP also had eighteen members from Malabar and South Canara/Bellary.

Opposition to Rajaji
Mahatma Gandhi and the National Congress leadership supported the selection Rajaji as Chief Minister of Madras Presidency. This was against the Congress policy of not re-instating leaders who had opposed the Quit India Movement. Prakasam, Madhava Menon and  Kamaraj, provincial presidents of Congress Committee in Andhra, Kerala and Tamil Nadu respectively were invited to New Delhi for negotiations. Despite Gandhi's intervention, Rajaji's election was defeated by 148 votes to 38.

T. Prakasam
Kamaraj and Kerala Pradesh Congress Committee President K. Madhava Menon supported C. N. Muthuranga Mudaliar for the post of chief minister and were opposed to Prakasam's candidacy. Rajaji and the Reform Group observed neutrality because of a prior agreement from 1937, which stipulated that the next Congress government would be headed by a member from Andhra. This led to the election of T. Prakasam by 82 votes to 69. Difference of opinion arose between Prakasam and Kamaraj over several issues including the inclusion of Madhava Menon in the cabinet. Kamaraj supported his inclusion and Prakasam supported Raghava Menon who belonged to the pro-Rajaji group. Dissatisfaction with Prakasam's textile mill policies and his slow implementation of prohibition, lead to his fall. Prakasam was voted out of power and submitted his resignation on 14 March 1947. The Reform Group allied with other opponents of Prakasam for his ouster.

T. Prakasam cabinet
Council of ministers in T. Prakasam's cabinet (1 May 1946 – 23 March 1947)

Changes
B. Veeraswami resigned on 3 February 1947 and was replaced with B. Venkatarathanam as minister for Forest, Cinchona, Fisheries and Village industries on 6 February.

Omandur Ramaswamy Reddiar
On 21 March 1947, Omandur Ramaswamy Reddiar was selected as the Chief minister supported by Kamaraj and the anti-Prakasam factional alliance. In 1948, Prakasam sought re-election  by contesting against Reddiar, who in addition to Kamaraj, was supported by other notable Andhra members such as N. Sanjeeva Reddy and Kala Venkata Rao. Prakasam was defeated by a vote of 112 to 84. Gradually Reddiar became dissatisfied with Kamaraj's interference in his administration. When he showed signs of independence, Kamaraj ousted him by vote of no confidence in the CLP on 31 March 1949.

Omandurar's cabinet
Council of ministers in Omandur Ramasami Reddiar's cabinet (24 March 1947 – 6 April 1949)

Changes
Subbarayan resigned on 5 April 1948, Daniel Thomas on 15 June 1948 and Kala Venkata Rao on 24 January 1949.

P. S. Kumaraswamy Raja
P. S. Kumaraswamy Raja, the next Chief Minister who formed the Government on 6 April 1949 was believed to be a stooge of Kamaraj. His election was opposed by P. Subbarayan, Rajaji and Prakasam. Kumaraswamy Raja ruled Madras till the 1952 election when he lost his seat in Srivilliputhur constituency.

Kumaraswamy Raja cabinet
Council of ministers in Kumaraswamy Raja cabinet (7 April 1949 – 9 April 1952)

Changes
Sanjiva Reddi resigned on 10 April 1951. Roche Victoria became minister on 2 June 1949 and Kala Venkata Rao on 26 September 1951. Some of the ministers resigned on 8 February 1952, when the results of 1952 election came out. Kumarasamy Raja, Rajan, Reddiar, Parameswaran, Sitarama Reddi, A. B. Shetty stayed on as a caretaker ministry till the next cabinet was formed on 10 April.

Impact
The provincial legislatures formed by the 1946 elections elected the members (from their own members) to the Indian Constituent Assembly in December 1946. The Constituent Assembly drafted the Constitution of the Indian Republic and also served as India's first Parliament after India's independence on 15 August 1947. Since Congress had an overwhelming majority in both houses of the Madras legislature it was able to send a large number of its members to the Assembly.

List of Constituent Assembly members from Madras Presidency:

See also
1946 Madras Presidency legislative council election

References

External links
Text of Gandhi's article in Harijan and Kamaraj's resignation announcement

State Assembly elections in the Madras Presidency
1946 elections in India
Madras